Lawrence Douglas "Larry" Wilder Jr. (born February 17, 1962) is a former member of the Virginia House of Delegates from Richmond. He is the son of former Virginia governor L. Douglas Wilder.

External links
 

1962 births
Living people
Politicians from Richmond, Virginia
African-American state legislators in Virginia
Democratic Party members of the Virginia House of Delegates
21st-century African-American people
20th-century African-American people